Kruså (German: Krusau) is a Danish border town and border crossing with a population of 1,560 (1 January 2022), six kilometers north of Flensburg, situated on the European route E45. It is located in Aabenraa Municipality (prior to the Municipality Reform of 2007 in Bov municipality).

On 9 April 1940, at 4:15 am German troops crossed the border here beginning the invasion of Denmark.

Until the opening of the motorway border crossing at Frøslev Kruså was the most important crossing over land to Germany.

References

Cities and towns in the Region of Southern Denmark
Aabenraa Municipality